Robert-Fleury may refer to:

 Joseph-Nicolas Robert-Fleury (1797 – 1890), French painter
 Tony Robert-Fleury (1837 – 1911), French painter